Bladder sphincter dyssynergia (also known as detrusor sphincter dyssynergia (DSD) (the ICS standard terminology agreed 1998)  and neurogenic detrusor overactivity (NDO)) is a consequence of a neurological pathology such as spinal injury  or multiple sclerosis which disrupts central nervous system regulation of the micturition (urination) reflex resulting in dyscoordination of the detrusor muscles of the bladder and the male or female external urethral sphincter muscles. In normal lower urinary tract function, these two separate muscle structures act in synergistic coordination.  But in this neurogenic disorder, the urethral sphincter muscle, instead of relaxing completely during voiding, dyssynergically contracts causing the flow to be interrupted and the bladder pressure to rise.

Presentation
People with this condition generally experience daytime and night time wetting, urinary retention, and often have a history of urinary tract and bladder infections. Constipation and encopresis are often associated with this condition. Pseudodyssynergia has different causes but presents similarly.

Pathology 
The pathophysiology of the condition results from neuronal plasticity associated with bladder afferents and motor neurons innervating the external urethral sphincter.

Treatment
Botulinum A toxin is a valuable alternative for patients who do not want surgical methods.

References

Further reading

External links 

Urinary bladder disorders